Robin Rosenberg may refer to:

Robin L. Rosenberg (born 1962), American judge
Robin S. Rosenberg, American psychologist involved in the Ethan Couch case